2022 Hazfi Cup Final was the final match of the 35th edition of Hazfi Cup that was held between Nassaji Mazandaran and Aluminium Arak at Azadi Stadium in Tehran on 27 April 2022.

Originally, the final was planned to be held at Yadegar-e Emam Stadium in Tabriz on above date. However, the protest of the two clubs due to the distance between Qaemshahr and Arak to Tabriz caused the decision of the league organization to be changed. After the official and written protest of the two clubs of Arak and Mazandaran, these protests were examined by the Iran Football League Organization (by order of the Minister Hamid Sajjadi) and they announced that their request for holding the final match in Azadi Stadium has been accepted.

Nassaji Mazandaran defeated Aluminium Arak 1–0 to celebrate the first championship in the history of their club and also Hazfi Cup.

Teams

Route to the final

Aluminium Arak

As a Persian Gulf Pro League, Aluminium entered the competition from Round of 32.

They beat Fajr Sepasi at home in the fourth round.

They beat Sepahan at home in the fifth round.

They beat Persepolis away in the quarter-final.

They beat Khalij Fars Mahshahr at home in the semi-final.

Nassaji Mazandaran

   

As a Persian Gulf Pro League, Nassaji entered the competition from Round of 32.

They beat Arman Gohar Sirjan at Imam Ali Stadium (away) in the  fourth round.

They beat Gol Gohar at home in the fifth round.

They beat Esteghlal Tehran at away in the quarter-final.

They beat Mes Kerman home in the semi-final.

Details

See also 
 2021–22 Persian Gulf Pro League
 2021–22 Azadegan League
 2021–22 Hazfi Cup
 2022 Iranian Super Cup

References

Hazfi Cup Final
2021–22 Hazfi Cup
2022
F.C. Nassaji Mazandaran matches
Aluminium Arak F.C. matches